Amanullah Khan Yasinzai (born 7 August 1954) was the 21st Governor of Balochistan. He is a former Chief Justice of the Balochistan High Court (BHC).

Early life and education
Yasinzai was born on 7 August 1954 in Quetta. He received his Bachelors' and Master's degree from Forman Christian College in Lahore.

Career
Yasinzai served as a Justice of the Balochistan High Court from 27 January 1997 to 5 August 2009. He served as the Chief Justice of the BHC from 14 September 2005 until his resignation in 2009. He took oath under the Provisional Constitutional Order when former president Pervez Musharraf declared an emergency in November 2007. He 	seemingly resigned from his post to avoid facing references in the Supreme Judicial Council of Pakistan following a Supreme Court judgment in the PCO Judges case.

Yasinzai was appointed as the 24th Governor of Balochistan by President of Pakistan Arif Alvi on the advice of Prime Minister of Pakistan Imran Khan on 3 October 2018. He took oath of office on 4 October 2018.

He presented his resignation to President of Pakistan on 7 July 2021.His resignation was accepted by President Arif Alvi.

References

Living people
1954 births
Pakistani judges
Chief Justices of the Balochistan High Court
Forman Christian College alumni
People from Quetta
Governors of Balochistan, Pakistan